Piazzi  is an Italian surname, may refer to:
 Giuseppe Piazzi was an Italian Theatine monk, mathematician, and astronomer.
 Giuseppe Piazzi (Bishop), Italian prelate of 20th Century.
 Fladimir Rufino Piazzi Júnior, (born 1978) Brazilian footballer

Piazzi may also refer to:

 Charles Piazzi Smyth (1819-1900), English astronomer
 Piazzi (crater), a 2.3 km-deep lunar crater